Darrin Reed Cowan (also known as Reed Abplanalp-Cowan) (born July 24, 1972) is an American journalist.

Cowan co-directed the GLAAD Media Award winning 2010 documentary 8: The Mormon Proposition with Steven Greenstreet.

Career
Cowan started his journalism career working as a radio disc-jockey for KNEU Radio in Roosevelt, Utah. In 1995, Cowan worked as a part-time on-air reporter for Fox's KSTU in Salt Lake City, Utah while a student at Utah State University. From there he assumed full-time positions as an anchor for KBAK-TV in Bakersfield, California and as an anchor for WWTV in Cadillac, Michigan. Cowan next worked as a reporter and weekend morning anchor for KSL-TV in Salt Lake City.

After KSL-TV, Cowan moved to KTVX, also in Salt Lake City. While there, he anchored Good Morning Utah and covered the terrorist attacks of 9-11, the kidnapping of Elizabeth Smart, the murder of Lori Hacking, the death of former President Ronald Reagan and the fugitive stories of polygamist sect leader Warren Jeffs. For his work, Cowan was nominated and won Emmy awards for reporting.

Personal life
Cowan was born on July 24, 1972 in Roosevelt, Utah and was raised in the Mormon religion. During his teenage years Cowan had a relationship with Gregory Abplanalp, who attended the same high school as Cowan. Cowan ended the relationship at the request of a church leader and went through years of various forms of conversion therapy, then married a woman at the urging of another church leader. During this marriage Cowan had his first child, Wesley, who died in 2006 after falling from a horizontal set of monkey bars. The marriage ended after three years and Cowan re-united with Abplanalp, whom he married on September 4, 2013 in Laguna Beach and with whom adopted three children. The couple sustained dozens of Utah’s gay couples receiving marriage licenses at the Washington County Clerk’s office on December 23, 2013. Cowan is also a triathlete.

Wesley's death prompted Cowan to found the Wesley Smiles Coalition, which works with Free the Children to raise funds to build schools in Africa. Cowan also made the 2007 documentary The Other Side of the Lens, which covers his emotions over his son's death and his experiences with the media attention Wesley's death attracted.

Cowan is also on the advisory board for Free The Children, a child advocacy organization, and serves as a producer for the youth organization Power In You. He is also an active supporter of anti-bullying legislation and has worked as a public speaker on the subject of bullying in school.

Alleged extortion

In April 2021, Cowan demanded $20 million from Toronto-based WE Charity for the "destruction of his character and marketability as a journalist, public speaker, filmmaker and author," stating that if they did not pay he would use his position as an anchorman with Sinclair Broadcast Group to destroy their reputation. The dispute arose from the placement of a plaque honoring Cowan's deceased son Wesley at a school in Kenya built by WE Charity, about which Cowan had testified before the Canadian Parliament several weeks prior. WE Charity's attorneys responded by accusing Cowan of attempted extortion. Journalism professor and media ethics specialist Mary Hausch of the University of Nevada, Las Vegas commented that Cowan's threats breached established standards requiring journalists to avoid conflicts of interest.

Filmography
The Other Side of the Lens (2009, as producer, director)
8: The Mormon Proposition (2010, as producer, director)

Awards and nominations
 2007, nominated Rocky Mountain Regional Emmy Award for KTVX
 2008, won Rocky Mountain Regional Emmy Award for KTVX
 2008, nominated Suncoast Regional Emmy Award for WSVN 
 2009, nominated Suncoast Regional Emmy Award for WSVN
 2011, won GLAAD Media Award for Outstanding Documentary for 8: The Mormon Proposition
 2013, won 5 Pacific Southwest Regional Emmy Awards for KSNV-DT (now KSNV)
 2014, won 4 Pacific Southwest Regional Emmy Awards for KSNV-DT (now KSNV)
 2015, nominated 3 Pacific Southwest Regional Emmy Awards for KSNV-DT (now KSNV)
 2016, won Pacific Southwest Regional Emmy Award for KSNV

References

External links
 
 

1972 births
Living people
American directors
American human rights activists
American male journalists
American producers
American television reporters and correspondents
Former Latter Day Saints
Journalists from California
Journalists from Florida
Journalists from Las Vegas
Journalists from Michigan
Journalists from Utah
LGBT Latter Day Saints
People from Roosevelt, Utah
Television anchors from Las Vegas
Regional Emmy Award winners
Television anchors from San Francisco